Matías Emilio Carabajal  (born 3 June 1986 in Fraile Pintado, Jujuy) is an Argentine footballer. He currently plays as a midfielder for Central Córdoba of Torneo Federal A in Argentina.

Clubs

References 
  (archive)
 
 
 
 
 

1986 births
Living people
Argentine footballers
Sportspeople from Jujuy Province
Association football midfielders